Events in the year 1997 in  Turkey.

Parliament
20th Parliament of Turkey

Incumbents
President – Süleyman Demirel
Prime Minister –
Necmettin Erbakan (up to 30 June) 
Mesut Yılmaz (from 30 June)
Leader of the opposition –
Mesut Yılmaz (up to 30 June)
Necmettin Erbakan (from 30 June)

Ruling party and the main opposition
 Ruling party 
 Welfare Party (RP) with coalition partner True Path Party (DYP)
Motherland Party (ANAP) with coalition partners Democratic Left Party (DSP) and Democrat Turkey Party (DTP)
 Main opposition 
 Motherland Party (ANAP) (up to 30 June)
Welfare Party (RP) (from 30 June)

Cabinet
54th government of Turkey (up to 30 June)
55th government of Turkey (from 30 June)

Events
8 January – Democrat Turkey Party was founded by Hüsamettin Cindoruk.
11 January – Prime minister Necmettin Erbakan invited religious order leaders to his Office . This invitation caused political unrest
24 January – Sabotage to Kirkuk–Ceyhan Oil Pipeline
2 February – Beginning of a civil disobedience action  1 minute darkness for a continuous light by turning off the lights every night for 1 minute
28 February – In a meeting of National Security Council the military members of the council asked for a secular administration (This event later on was ironically called post modern coup) 
23 April – On children’s day, Tansu Çiller, the vice prime minister, announced that the compulsory education was raised from 5 years to 8 years 
15 May – Turkey enters northern Iraq with the stated aim of "supporting KDP actions against the PKK."
16 May – Yaşar Kemal won Peace Prize of the German Book Trade
22 May – Four male and six female Turkish weightlifters won the gold medal in 1997 European Weightlifting Championships  
25 May – Galatasaray won the championship of the Turkish football league
21 June – Upon Necmettin Erbakan’s resignation, the president appointed Mesut Yılmaz to form the new government.
25 October – Bus accident in Konya Province 49 deaths
14 December – At the Luxembourg summit, the European Union decided to continue negotiations with Turkey

Death
4 April – Alparslan Türkeş (born in 1917), politician
4 May – Esin Engin (born in 1945), musician
20 June – Cahit Külebi (born in 1917), poet
26 August – Füreya Koral (born in 1910), ceramist
26 December – Cahit Arf (born in 1910), mathematician

Gallery

See also
1996-97 1.Lig
Turkey in the Eurovision Song Contest 1997

References

 
Turkey
Turkey
Years of the 20th century in Turkey
Turkey
1990s in Turkey